Kuntur Sinqa (Quechua kuntur condor, sinqa, nose, "condor nose", also spelled Condorsenja) is a mountain in the Cusco Region in Peru, about  high. It lies in the Paruro Province, Pillpinto District. Kuntur Sinqa is situated west of the Apurímac River.

References 

Mountains of Peru
Mountains of Cusco Region